Blendi is a predominantly Albanian language masculine given name. Notable people bearing the name Blendi include:

Blendi Baftiu (born 1998), Kosovan footballer
Blendi Fevziu (born 1969), Albanian journalist, writer and TV host
Blendi Idrizi (born 1998), Kosovan footballer 
Blendi Klosi (born 1971), Albanian politician 
Blendi Nallbani (born 1971), Albanian footballer

Masculine given names
Albanian masculine given names